Rabbit Rock is a small, granite island 200 m off the north-eastern coast of Wilsons Promontory, Victoria, Australia.  It is part of the Wilsons Promontory Islands Important Bird Area, identified as such by BirdLife International because of its importance for breeding seabirds.

See also
 Rabbit Island (Bass Strait)

References

External links
 Parks Victoria - Wilsons Promontory Marine National Park

Islands of Victoria (Australia)
Wilsons Promontory
Important Bird Areas of Victoria (Australia)